Levino is a rural locality (a village) in Denyatinskoye Rural Settlement, Melenkovsky District, Vladimir Oblast, Russia. The population was 367 as of 2010. There are 4 streets.

Geography 
Levino is located 24 km north of Melenki (the district's administrative centre) by road. Aleksandrino is the nearest rural locality.

References 

Rural localities in Melenkovsky District